The Ivan Gren class, Russian designation Project 11711, is a class of landing ship that is being built for the Russian Navy. The class was to be composed of two vessels, Ivan Gren and Pyotr Morgunov, but later it was announced that the Russian Navy intends to acquire several more vessels of a modified design.

Design and construction
The vessels of the class have a displacement of 5,000–6,000 tons and are able to carry up to 13 main battle tanks or 36 armoured personnel carriers and 300 marines. The first ship of the class, Ivan Gren, was laid down on 23 December 2004. The hull of Ivan Gren was completed by the end of November 2010. On 9 October 2010 a contract to increase work on the vessel was signed. The ship was launched on 18 May 2012 and was scheduled to be delivered to the Russian Navy by 2014. Delivery of Ivan Gren was delayed until 2015 while the second ship of the class, Pyotr Morgunov, was laid down in October 2014. Ivan Gren started its sea trials in June 2016 in the Baltic Sea. According to Russian sources, the delaying of commissioning of the lead ship was due to several design faults that includes hull stability and engine problems.

On 3 May 2018, the lead ship of the class, Ivan Gren, successfully completed its sea trials held in the Baltic Sea. The warship's systems and complexes were checked by the state acceptance commission of Russia's Defense Ministry. Ivan Gren was accepted into service on 20 June 2018.

Initially, there were no plans to build more ships following Pyotr Morgunov. However, in December 2018, it was reported by the head of Russia's United Shipbuilding Corporation that Russia plans to order additional two or three modified Ivan Gren-class landing ships. On 9 April 2019, Russian Defence Minister Sergey Shoygu announced two more Project 11711 landing ships will be laid down on 23 April 2019.

On 23 April 2019, two modified Project 11711 landing ships, Vladimir Andreev and Vasily Trushin, were laid down during a ceremony at the Yantar Shipyard in Kaliningrad. The two new ships differ with modified superstructure, increased displacement, 16D49 engines , larger dimensions and one single superstructure and capability to carry the Kamov Ka-52K carrier-based attack helicopters. The displacement of the enlarged vessels is reported to be up to 40 % heavier than the baseline version or as heavy as up to 9240 tons (though some sources suggest a displacement of only 7,000 to 8,000 tons) and the amphibious lift capacity has grown by 100 % (to 26 tanks). Their delivery to the Russian Navy is scheduled for 2023 and 2024, respectively. 

Pyotr Morgunov was commissioned on 23 December 2020. On 30 January 2021 she arrived at its permanent base in Severomorsk under the command of the Captain  2nd rank Vyacheslav Solovyov.

From February 2022, Pyotr Morgunov was deployed in the Black Sea and participating in the Russian invasion of Ukraine.

Ships

See also
 List of ships of the Russian Navy
 List of ships of Russia by project number

References

External links 
  Secret Projects – Project 11711 ''Ivan Gren;;
  Harpoondatabases.com – LST Ivan Gren (Project 11711) class
 All Ivan Gren-class landing ships – Complete Ship List

Amphibious warfare vessel classes
Amphibious warfare vessels of the Russian Navy